Lilli Marlene is a 1950 British war film aimed for the US market and directed by Arthur Crabtree. It stars Lisa Daniely, Hugh McDermott, and Richard Murdoch. Stanley Baker is seen in one of his early support roles.

Plot
A French girl named Lilli Marlene, working in her uncle's café in Benghazi, Libya, turns out to be the girl that the popular German wartime song Lili Marleen had been written for before the war, so both the British and the Germans try to use her for propaganda purposes - especially as it turns out that she can sing as well. The Germans try to snatch her at one point, but don't succeed, and she performs several times for the British troops and also appears in radio broadcasts to the USA, arranged by Steve, an American war correspondent embedded with the British Eighth Army, who eventually becomes her boyfriend.

Later, the Germans successfully kidnap her in Cairo and she is taken to Berlin, where she is interrogated and repeatedly told that she had been tortured and brainwashed by the British to think that she was French, when she actually is German. Once the Germans think that she has been transformed into a loyal Nazi, they set her to make broadcasts in English for the Third Reich. Her old British friends, and especially Steve, are very disappointed in her.

After the war, she reappears in London during a big reunion for members of the Eighth Army. She manages to convince Steve and a few of her other Eighth Army friends that she never betrayed the British; however, British security agents try to arrest her. Steve and another old friend, Berry, take off with her in their broadcasting van, chased by the security people. They drive to an address in London that she had been given by the German colonel in charge of her broadcasts, in case she ever went to London and was in need of help. When they get there, she finds that the German colonel lives in it. It turns out that he is actually a British intelligence officer who was working undercover in Berlin during the war. He informs them and the security people that Lilli was never a traitor, and that, in all her communications, there were encoded messages to the British intelligence services back in London.

Once they know the truth, Steve and Berry take her back to the reunion, where everybody is told that Lilli never was a traitor. She sings the Lili Marleen song for all of them and afterwards she and Steve kiss.

Main cast 

 Lisa Daniely as Lilli Marlene  
 Hugh McDermott as Steve
 Richard Murdoch as Flight-Lieutenant Murdoch
 Leslie Dwyer as Berry
 Estelle Brody as Estelle
 Stanley Baker as Evans
 John Blythe as Holt  
 Cecil Brock as O'Riley
 Russell Hunter as Scottie  
 Marcel Poncin as Lestoque
 Judith Warden as Auntie
 Michael Ward as Wintertree
 Lawrence O'Madden as Col. Wharton
 Stuart Lindsell as Major Phillips
 Olaf Olsen as Nazi Officer
 Irene Prador as Nurse Schmidt
 Aud Johansen as Nurse Melke
 Carl Jaffe as Propaganda Chief
 Philo Hauser as Fratzell
 Richard Marner as SS Colonel
 Peter Swanwick as Chief Interrogator
 Walter Gotell as Direktor of Propaganda
 Arthur Lawrence as Lieber
 Rufus Cruikshank as Sgt. Bull
 Barbara Cummings as Shirley
 Neil Tuson as Producer
 Conrad Phillips as Security Officer
 Kenneth Cleveland as Security Officer
 Ben Williams as Brownie

Follow-up film
Three years later, Arthur Crabtree made a follow-up film with the same actors playing Marlene and Steve: The Wedding of Lilli Marlene.

References

External links
 
  
 
 

1950 films
1950 drama films
Films directed by Arthur Crabtree
British World War II films
British war drama films
RKO Pictures films
British black-and-white films
1950 war films
Films shot at Station Road Studios, Elstree
1950s English-language films
1950s British films